Cristiano Teixeira (born March 15, 1988 in Feira de Santana), sometimes known as just Cristiano, is a Brazilian attacking midfielder. He plays for Figueirense.

Contract
1 December 2004 to 30 November 2007

External links

CBF 
Guardian Stats Centre
zerozero.pt 

1988 births
Living people
Brazilian footballers
Figueirense FC players
People from Feira de Santana
Association football midfielders
Sportspeople from Bahia